Latrous is a surname. Notable people with the surname include:

Lila Latrous (born 1979), Algerian judoka
Lotti Latrous (born 1953), Swiss philanthropist